Deir Aames is a municipality in Southern Lebanon, located in Tyre District, Governorate of South Lebanon.

Name
According to E. H. Palmer, the name means "the convent of Amis."

History
In 1243, during the Crusader era, Deir Aames (called Derreme, or Dairrhamos) belonged to Venice.

Ottoman era
In the early 1860s, Ernest Renan noted: "'At Deir Amis there is a large basin of great stones, and a portion of wall which seems
of Crusading times. At the church there is a drawing like the stone of Aitit. As the stone of Deir Amis is certainly Christian, so must also be that of Aitit."

In 1875, Victor Guérin found the village to be inhabited by Metuali families. He further noted: "numerous ruined houses, a fragment of a column in the interior of a small mosque, cut stones scattered over the ground, cisterns cut in the rock, a tank partly built and partly rock-cut. On an ancient lintel is carved a double cross in a circle."

In 1881, the PEF's Survey of Western Palestine (SWP) described it: "A village, built of stone, situated on a ridge,
with olives and arable land around, containing about 100 Metawileh; water from cisterns."

References

Bibliography

External links
Deir Aames, Localiban
Survey of Western Palestine, Map 2:  IAA, Wikimedia commons

Populated places in Tyre District
Shia Muslim communities in Lebanon